Major General Sir Nevill Maskelyne Smyth,  (14 August 1868 – 21 July 1941) was a senior officer in the British Army and a recipient of the Victoria Cross, the highest award for gallantry in the face of the enemy that can be awarded to British and Commonwealth forces.

Early life
Born the son of Warington Wilkinson Smyth, a noted geologist, his grandfather was Admiral William Henry Smyth. His father's sister, Henrietta Grace Powell, was Robert Baden-Powell's mother making Baden-Powell, the founder of the Scout Movement, Smyth's first cousin.

Smyth was educated at Westminster School and graduated from the Royal Military College, Sandhurst, in 1888. He was posted to the Queen's Bays (2nd Dragoon Guards) in India as a second lieutenant on 22 August 1888. In 1890 he was attached to the Royal Engineers to assist with a railway survey during the Zhob Valley expedition.

Sudan
1896 saw him stationed in Cairo with his regiment, and he was promoted lieutenant on 26 April. For his services in the initial stages of the Mahdist War he was mentioned in dispatches on 3 November 1896, and awarded the Order of the Medjidieh, Fourth Class in 1897.

On 8 December 1897 Smyth was promoted captain. On 2 September came the Battle of Omdurman. Near to the end of the battle, a dervish tried to spear two war correspondents; Smyth galloped forward and, though severely speared through the arm, shot the man dead. This action saw him awarded the Victoria Cross. The citation was gazetted on 15 November 1898, and read:

Smyth was also Mentioned in Despatches. In November 1899 he was Intelligence officer and ADC to Colonel Lewis, commanding the Infantry Brigade during the operations leading to the defeat of the Khalifa in the Battle of Umm Diwaykarat. He was Mentioned in Despatches, and was awarded the Order of Osmanieh, Fourth Class in 1900.

Smyth rejoined the Queens Bays for active service in South Africa in the Second Boer War. He was awarded a brevet majority on 22 August 1902 for his South African service.

Smyth was promoted to substantive major on 27 October 1903 when he transferred to the Carabiniers (6th Dragoon Guards), who were then in India and returned to South Africa in 1908. He was promoted lieutenant colonel on 1 May 1909, and became commanding officer of the Carabiniers. The regiment returned to England in 1912. According to the London Gazette, he completed the standard four-year period as a regimental commander on 1 May 1909, and was placed on half-pay. However the same issue, carried notice of his promotion to colonel backdated to 4 December 1912. He was seconded to the Egyptian Army, and in 1913–14 he was commandant of the Khartoum district where he was active in combating the slave trade.

First World War
Smyth was dispatched to Gallipoli by Lord Kitchener, arriving in May 1915. He commanded the 1st Australian Infantry Brigade as a temporary brigadier general at the Battle of Lone Pine and was one of the last officers to leave the peninsula. He was appointed Companion of the Order of the Bath (CB) on 1 January 1916, and received a further Mention in Despatches on 28 January 1916. Smyth led the brigade in France in 1916, and on 28 December was given command of the 2nd Australian Division as a temporary major general. He was Mentioned in Despatches twice more, on 15 May 1917 and 11 December 1917, and was promoted substantive major general on 1 January 1918 as a "reward for distinguished service in the field." He was transferred back to the British Army in May 1918 and briefly commanded the 58th (2/1st London) Division and then the 59th (2nd North Midland) Division from August 1918, leading the latter during the liberation of Lille in October 1918. He had learned to fly in 1913 and was known for borrowing aircraft to look at the lines for himself. He was yet again Mentioned in Despatches on 20 December 1918.

Smyth was promoted Knight Commander of the Order of the Bath (KCB) in the 1919 King's Birthday Honours. On 30 July 1919 was appointed General Officer Commanding 47th (1/2nd London) Division (Territorial Force). During the war he had also been awarded the Belgian Croix de Guerre, and the French Legion of Honour in the grade of Officer. In all, he was Mentioned in Despatches eleven times during his career. He was appointed colonel of the 3rd Dragoon Guards on 1 October 1920. He relinquished command of his division on 30 July 1923. Smyth retired from the British Army on 5 July 1924, and relinquished the colonelcy of the 3rd Dragoon Guards on 16 October 1925.

Smyth served as the Honorary Colonel of the South African Natal Carbineers from 1920 to 1925 and then of the 37/39 Battalion, Australia.

Australia
After his retirement he emigrated to Australia and farm in Balmoral, Victoria in 1925 with his wife and three children. He took to politics in the National Party of Australia and stood unsuccessfully for a Victorian seat in the Australian Senate. He died at home in 1941 and was buried in Balmoral Cemetery.

One of his sons, Dacre Smyth, followed a military career in the Royal Australian Navy rising to commodore.

References

External links

 

1868 births
1941 deaths
Burials in Victoria (Australia)
British Army major generals
People from Westminster
People educated at Westminster School, London
2nd Dragoon Guards (Queen's Bays) officers
3rd Dragoon Guards officers
3rd Carabiniers officers
British recipients of the Victoria Cross
Knights Commander of the Order of the Bath
British Army personnel of the Mahdist War
Recipients of the Croix de guerre (Belgium)
English emigrants to Australia
British Army personnel of the Second Boer War
Carabiniers (6th Dragoon Guards) officers
Graduates of the Royal Military College, Sandhurst
Egyptian military officers
British Army cavalry generals of World War I
Australian generals
Australian military personnel of World War I
Nationalist Party (Australia) politicians
Officiers of the Légion d'honneur
Recipients of the Order of the Medjidie
British Army recipients of the Victoria Cross
Military personnel from London